Russell Keith Hobby (born 22 January 1933) is an Australian fencer. He competed at the 1964 and 1968 Summer Olympics. He was a longstanding member of the Melbourne-based VRI Fencing Club.

References

1933 births
Living people
Australian male fencers
Olympic fencers of Australia
Fencers at the 1964 Summer Olympics
Fencers at the 1968 Summer Olympics
Sportspeople from Fremantle
Commonwealth Games medallists in fencing
Commonwealth Games silver medallists for Australia
Commonwealth Games bronze medallists for Australia
Fencers at the 1966 British Empire and Commonwealth Games
20th-century Australian people
21st-century Australian people
Medallists at the 1966 British Empire and Commonwealth Games